Nuku District may refer to:
 Nuku District, Papua New Guinea
 Nuku District, Fiji

District name disambiguation pages